The Hughes AIM-47 Falcon, originally GAR-9, was a very long-range high-performance air-to-air missile that shared the basic design of the earlier AIM-4 Falcon. It was developed in 1958 along with the new Hughes AN/ASG-18 radar fire-control system intended to arm the Mach 3 XF-108 Rapier interceptor aircraft and, after that jet's cancellation, the YF-12A(whose production was itself cancelled after only 3 vehicles). It was never used operationally, but was a direct predecessor of the AIM-54 Phoenix used on the Grumman F-14 Tomcat.

Development

Development for XF-108
In the early 1950s, the United States Air Force developed requirements for a high speed, high performance interceptor aircraft, originally called the LRI-X. In 1957, Hughes won the contract to supply the weapons system for this aircraft. This system consisted of the GAR-X missile and the YX-1 radar and fire control system. The original missile design had a range of 15 to 25 miles (25 to 40 km), and could be equipped with a conventional warhead or a 0.25 kiloton version of the W42 nuclear warhead. When the North American XF-108 Rapier was announced as the winner of the LRI-X contest in April 1958, the Hughes entries were redesignated GAR-9 and AN/ASG-18 on the same day. The F-108 was cancelled in September 1959, but the Air Force decided to continue development of the missile system with both warheads.

During its development, the capabilities of the new missile grew tremendously. Growing much larger, the missile's range was extended to 100 miles (160 km), using the Aerojet-General XM59 solid-fuel motor. Since this would be beyond the range of effective semi-active radar homing, a new active-radar terminal seeker was added to the missile. This seeker was a powerful system of its own, with the resolution to be able to lock onto a  target at 63 nm (116 km). Using an active seeker eliminated the inherent long-range inaccuracy of semi-active homing, allowing the missile to be launched at any range where it could see the target.

Problems with the motor during development led to the brief consideration of using a storable liquid-fuel rocket design, but was replaced instead by the Lockheed XSR13-LP-1 solid rocket. This lowered the top speed from Mach 6 to Mach 4. In this form, the GAR-9 started ground firings in August 1961. For air-launch testing at supersonic speeds the Republic XF-103 had originally been proposed as a test platform, but this aircraft was cancelled before reaching the prototype stage. Instead, B-58 Hustler s/n 55-665 was modified to house the AN/ASG-18 radar in a large protruding radome that gave it the nickname "Snoopy", and in-flight launches started in May 1962.

Development for YF-12
In 1960 Lockheed started development of the Lockheed YF-12 interceptor,  as a lower-cost replacement for the F-108. The GAR-9/ASG-18 were moved to this project. The F-12 would have featured four flip-open internal weapons bays on the chines behind the cockpit, one of these filled with electronics. The F-12B bays were too small for the GAR-9, so the GAR-9B was developed with flip-out fins to reduce its diameter.

Test firings of the GAR-9A from the prototype F-12As resulted in six kills from seven launches, the lone miss due to a missile power failure (there were several non-guiding test launches as well). The missile was renamed AIM-47 in late 1962 as part of the transition to common naming for aerospace vehicles across the U.S. Department of Defense in 1962. The last launch was from a YF-12 flying at Mach 3.2 and an altitude of 74,400 feet (22,677 m) at a QB-47 target drone 500 feet (152 m) off the ground.

In 1966, the F-12 project was cancelled just as the F-108 had been. Another project which expressed an interest in the design was the XB-70 Valkyrie, a bomber which could have carried the AIM-47 for self-defense. This aircraft was also cancelled after Soviet deployment of effective high-altitude surface-to-air missiles made high-altitude attacks on the Soviet Union impractical.

Hughes had built 80 pre-production AIM-47 missiles.

Legacy 
The AIM-47 was used as a base for the AIM-54 Phoenix (originally the AAM-N-11), intended for the General Dynamics F-111B. This project was also canceled in 1968, but the weapon system finally found a home on the F-14 Tomcat, entering service in the early 1970s.

In 1966, the basic airframe was adapted with the seeker from the AGM-45 Shrike and the  warhead from the Mk. 81 bomb to create the high-speed AGM-76 Falcon anti-radar missile, although this did not see service.

See also 
 Missile designation

References

External links
 AIM-47 Falcon missile launch

AIM-047
Abandoned military rocket and missile projects of the United States
Military equipment introduced in the 1960s